The 1927 Arizona Wildcats football team represented the University of Arizona as an independent during the 1927 college football season. In their 13th season under head coach Pop McKale, the Wildcats compiled a 4–2–1 record and outscored their opponents, 165 to 59. The team captain was Martin Gentry.

Schedule

References

Arizona
Arizona Wildcats football seasons
Arizona Wildcats football